Sameodesma xanthocraspia is a moth in the family Crambidae. It is found in the Democratic Republic of Congo (North Kivu), Ghana, South Africa and Zimbabwe.

References

Moths described in 1913
Spilomelinae